Football Club Goa is a professional association football club based in Goa, India, that plays in Indian Super League. The club was formed in 2014 and played its first competitive match on 15 October 2014 and were defeated FC Goa by 2-1 due well anticipated the goals of Balwant Singh and Elano of Chennaiyin FC whereby Goa was revived by the goal of Grégory Arnolin.The club has never won ISL titles but appeared crowned as the champions  of the Super Cup.

List of players

The list includes all the players registered under a FC Goa contract. Some players might not have featured in a professional game for the club.

List of foreign players
The list includes all the players registered under a FC Goa contract. Some players might not have featured in a professional game for the club.

Notable Internationals
 Robert Pires
 André Santos
 Grégory Arnolin
 Miroslav Slepička
 Zohib Islam Amiri
 Lúcio
 Léo Moura
 Richarlyson
 Coro
 Sergio Juste
 Ahmed Jahouh

References

Players
Lists of association football players by club in India
Lists of Indian Super League players

Association football player non-biographical articles